Windows 3.x means either of, or all of the following versions of Microsoft Windows:

 Windows 3.0 
 Windows 3.1x

Windows NT
 Windows NT 3.x

3.x